Stephen McBride may refer to:

 Stephen McBride (footballer, born 1964), Northern Irish footballer
 Stephen McBride (footballer, born 1983), footballer from Northern Ireland
 Stephen McBride (priest) (born 1961), Anglican priest
 Stephen McBride (politician) (born 1990), Boston City Council Candidate

See also
 Steve McBride (disambiguation)